South Tyrone was a constituency of the Parliament of Northern Ireland.

Boundaries
South Tyrone was a county constituency comprising the central part of County Tyrone. It was created when the House of Commons (Method of Voting and Redistribution of Seats) Act (Northern Ireland) 1929 introduced first-past-the-post elections throughout Northern Ireland. South Tyrone was created by the division of Fermanagh and Tyrone into eight new constituencies, of which five were in County Tyrone. The constituency survived unchanged, returning one member of Parliament, until the Parliament of Northern Ireland was temporarily suspended in 1972 and then formally abolished in 1973.

The seat was made up from parts of the rural districts of Clogher and Dungannon as well as the town of Dungannon.

Politics 
County Tyrone had five Stormont MPs from 1929 until 1972. The seats in the North and South of the county were Unionist, the constituency covering the East could be considered marginal, whilst those in the West and centre of the county were nationalist.

South Tyrone was contested by the Nationalist Party once, in 1949. All other contests were triggered by either an independent unionist or member of the Northern Ireland Labour Party standing against the Ulster Unionist Party, which consistently held the seat.

MPs for the area included Stormont's last Minister of State for Home Affairs, John Taylor, and William Frederick McCoy who served briefly as Speaker to the House of Commons of Northern Ireland from 25 January 1956 until 23 April 1956.

Members of Parliament

Election results 

At the 1933 Northern Ireland general election, Rowley Elliott was elected unopposed.

At the 1945 Northern Ireland general election, William Frederick McCoy was elected unopposed.

At the 1953, 1958 and 1962 Northern Ireland general elections, William Frederick McCoy was elected unopposed.

References

Northern Ireland Parliament constituencies established in 1929
Constituencies of the Northern Ireland Parliament
Historic constituencies in County Tyrone
Northern Ireland Parliament constituencies disestablished in 1973